The piping crow (Corvus typicus) is a species of bird in the family Corvidae. It is endemic to Sulawesi in Indonesia. Its natural habitat is subtropical or tropical moist lowland forest.

References

Endemic birds of Sulawesi
Corvus
Birds described in 1853
Taxa named by Charles Lucien Bonaparte
Taxonomy articles created by Polbot